Corominas is a Spanish surname that may refer to
Ernest Corominas (1913–1992), Spanish-French mathematician
Ferran Corominas (born 1983), Spanish football forward
Juan Manuel González Corominas (born 1968), Spanish off-road motorbike driver
Lluís Corominas (born 1963), Spanish lawyer and politician
Manuel Jalón Corominas (1925–2011), Spanish inventor
María Corominas (born 1952), Spanish swimmer

See also
Coromines

Spanish-language surnames
Catalan-language surnames